Kevin Lerell Henry (born October 23, 1968), who pronounces his first name Kee-vin (as in "key") is a former American football defensive lineman who played eight seasons in the National Football League (NFL) for the Pittsburgh Steelers. He played college football for Mississippi State University.

Henry was born in Mound Bayou, Mississippi, in 1968 and attended John F. Kennedy Memorial High School in that city. He then enrolled at Mississippi State University. He redshirted during his first year at the school and was ineligible as a sophomore after his American College Test (ACT) score was invalidated. He first saw game action as a junior and led the team with six quarterback sacks. As a senior, he started seven games, but then sustained a tear in the posterior cruciate ligament of his left knee. Despite the injury, he finished the 1992 season with 66 tackles and three sacks against Alabama.

Henry was selected by the Pittsburgh Steelers in the fourth round (108th overall pick) of the 1993 NFL Draft. He played at the defensive end position for the Steelers from 1993 to 2000, appearing in 116 NFL games, 81 of them as a starter. He tallied 74 tackles, eight tackles for loss, two interceptions, 14 sacks, and five recovered fumbles in his NFL career. His interception (and 38-yard return) of a Drew Bledsoe pass in December 1997 was referred to as the "immaculate interception."

Henry is cousins with former professional wrestler Mark Henry.

References

1968 births
Living people
People from Mound Bayou, Mississippi
American football defensive ends
Mississippi State Bulldogs football players
Pittsburgh Steelers players